Killing for Love may refer to:

 Killing for Love (film), a 2016 German documentary
 Killing for Love, a song by José González from his album In Our Nature